Irwon-dong is a ward of Gangnam-gu in South Korea.

Education
Schools located in Irwon-dong:
 Daemo Elementary School
 Daecheong Elementary School
 Irwon Elementary School
 Younghee Elementary School
 Joongdong Middle School
 Jungsan High School
 Joongdong High School
 Seoul Robotics High School
 Miral School

Transportation 
The area is served by Deachung Station and Irwon Station on the Seoul Subway Line 3, and Seoul buses.

See also 
Dong of Gangnam-gu

References

External links 
  Official site

Neighbourhoods in Gangnam District